Alex Cristian von Schwedler Vásquez (born 17 February 1980) is a Chilean former footballer who played as a centre-back. He was a four-time Chilean international.

Club career

Early career
Born in Santiago, Von Schwedler started his senior career at Universidad de Chile and he debuted for the club in 1998, aged 18. In 1999, Von Schwedler won his first league title and he was confirmed as defender in the. In the 2000 season, he was a key player under the squad of the coach César Vaccia, won his second league title and one Copa Chile.

His good seasons with the Universidad de Chile made the Italian side AS Bari notice him and shortly after being linked with the Serie B club. On 31 January 2003, Von Schwedler signed for Bari, joining his countrymen Jaime Valdés and Nicolás Córdova. He was a key player in the club, being in the starting lineup in many occasions. However, he joined SV Austria Salzburg on loan, and then moved to Red Bull Salzburg.

Portugal
During the summer of 2006, it was announced that Von Schwedler had joined CS Marítimo of the Portuguese Liga. On 22 October 2006, he made his Marítimo debut against SC Beira-Mar, playing the full 90 minutes. In his second match for the club, he scored his first for the club in the 4–1 victory against SC Braga, in the same match, he received a red card. On 25 December 2006, he scored the only (own) goal in a 1–0 away loss against Benfica at the Estádio da Luz. In June 2007, Von Schwedler left the club and signed for Alki Larnaca of the Cypriot First Division.

After one season in Cyprus, Von Schwedler returned to Portugal signing for CF Os Belenenses for the 2008–09 season. He made his Belenenses debut against Sporting Lisboa on 20 September 2009. He played only a few times and he was released from the club at the end of the season.

Colo-Colo
On 14 October 2009, after passing a medical, Von Schewdler joined Colo-Colo signing a contract until the end of the Torneo de Clausura in a free transfer. He joined the club because of the injury to the defender Miguel Riffo and he wears the number 33 shirt, due to the other numbers being in use by many players.

Von Schwedler made his Colo-Colo debut against Santiago Wanderers in a friendly match at Estadio Regional Chiledeportes as a 45th-minute substitute. When he entered to the field, he was booed by the supporters of Colo-Colo, because his pass for the club's archrival Universidad de Chile. He appeared on the bench on a few occasions and he did not play any matches. However, he proclaimed champion of the Torneo de Clausura. In December 2009, he was released from the club.

Everton
After several months without playing football, von Schwedler moved to Real España of the Honduran First División on 7 July 2010. However, one day later, Von Schwedler had a deal with Everton de Viña del Mar, joining that club, announcing that will not play for Real España.

On 17 July 2010, he debuted for Everton against Audax Italiano in a 2–0 loss. On 24 July, in his second match for the club, he scored his first goal for the club against Universidad Católica in a 1–1 draw at Estadio Sausalito, in the same game also received a red card. After the departure of Nelson Acosta, unfortunately the team was relegated to the second division. On 5 March 2011, von Schwedler scored his first goal in the Primera B in a 4–0 home win to Antofagasta.

International career
Alex von Schwedler played on four occasions for the Chile national football team. On 24 March 2007, he played his last game for Chile that was against Brazil in a 4–0 loss at Ullevi Stadium in Sweden. In this match, he committed a penalty on Lúcio in the 15th minute, receiving a yellow card, finally this penalty was scored by Ronaldinho, he finish being replaced by Reinaldo Navia in the 46th minute. In addition, he made an appearance for Chile B in the friendly match against Catalonia on 28 December 2001.

Honours

Club
Universidad de Chile
Primera División de Chile (2): 1999, 2000
Copa Chile (1): 2000

Colo-Colo
Primera División de Chile (1): 2009 Apertura

References

External links

1980 births
Living people
Footballers from Santiago
Chilean people of German descent
Chilean footballers
Chile international footballers
Chilean expatriate footballers
Universidad de Chile footballers
S.S.C. Bari players
ASKÖ Pasching players
FC Red Bull Salzburg players
C.S. Marítimo players
Alki Larnaca FC players
C.F. Os Belenenses players
Colo-Colo footballers
Everton de Viña del Mar footballers
Chilean Primera División players
Serie B players
Austrian Football Bundesliga players
Primeira Liga players
Cypriot First Division players
Chilean expatriate sportspeople in Italy
Chilean expatriate sportspeople in Austria
Chilean expatriate sportspeople in Portugal
Chilean expatriate sportspeople in Cyprus
Expatriate footballers in Italy
Expatriate footballers in Austria
Expatriate footballers in Portugal
Expatriate footballers in Cyprus
Association football defenders